The name Adele has been used for two tropical cyclones in the Eastern Pacific Ocean:

Hurricane Adele (1966), which made landfall in Mexico as a category 1 hurricane
Hurricane Adele (1970), a category 1 hurricane that never approached land

The name Adele was retired after 1970 and replaced with Aletta.

In the Southwestern Indian Ocean:

Tropical Disturbance Adele (1974), a depression in the Mozambique Channel that made landfall in Madagascar

In the Australian basin:

Cyclone Adele (1969), a tropical storm off the east coast of Australia that did not approach land

Pacific hurricane set index articles
South-West Indian Ocean cyclone set index articles
Australian region cyclone set index articles